The National Ice Hockey League is the second tier of professional hockey in England, Wales, and Scotland.

It may also refer to:

 Singapore National Ice Hockey League
 Liga Nacional de Hockey Hielo, the Spanish National Ice Hockey League

See also 
 List of ice hockey leagues, including entries for national leagues of ice hockey
 National Hockey League (ice hockey) of North America, the premiere global professional league
 National League (ice hockey), the Swiss elite league
 National League (disambiguation)